XHMLS-FM (91.3 MHz) is a radio station in Matamoros, Tamaulipas, Mexico.

History
XHMLS-FM is among the oldest FM stations in northeast Mexico. It received its concession on August 11, 1960, and was owned by Manuel L. Salinas. The original operating frequency was 98.1 MHz, with 1,000 watts ERP. Salinas died later in the 1960s, and his successors received control of the station in 1967.

In 1986, XHMLS was sold to Radiodifusoras Unidas Mexicanas de Matamoros. It also had found itself a new frequency, 101.5 MHz, operating at 3.348 kW ERP.

In 1992, XHMLS moved to 91.3 MHz. The station was sold to its current concessionaire in 2003.

External links
Official website
raiostationworld.com; Radio stations in the Rio Grande Valley

Radio stations in Matamoros, Tamaulipas